The Way It Really Is is an album by Lisa Loeb, released in 2004 by Zoë/Rounder.

The album title got its title from a previous song by Loeb, "The Way It Really Is" despite that song not appearing on this album.

Reception
Although the album was not as commercially successful as its predecessors, it was very well received by some critics who noted on the mature and strong writing by Loeb, with Stephen Thomas Erlewine calling it "the best, most cohesive record she's made, a clean, crisp collection of well-crafted, gentle tunes that slowly, surely work into the subconscious."

Track listing
"Window Shopping" (Dave Bassett, Lisa Loeb) – 3:17
"I Control the Sun" (Dave Bassett, Loeb) – 3:01
"Hand-Me-Downs" (Stephanie Bentley, Loeb) – 3:42
"Fools Like Me" (Loeb, Shelly Peiken, John Shanks) – 3:38
"Try" (Loeb) – 4:13
"Diamonds" (Loeb) – 3:04
"Would You Wander" (Loeb, Maia Sharp) – 3:33
"Probably" (Jimmy Harry, Loeb, Billy Steinberg) – 3:04
"Accident" (Loeb) – 4:04
"Lucky Me" (Loeb) – 2:29
"Now I Understand" (Loeb, Dweezil Zappa) – 3:07
Bonus track on the Japanese edition

Personnel
Chad Fischer - producer (tracks 3, 9), engineer (tracks 3, 7, 9), piano on "Hand-Me-Downs"
Larry Goldings - piano on "Accident"
Mark Meadows - bass (tracks 1, 2, 6, 8, 11)
Dweezil Zappa - electric guitar (tracks 2, 6, 11)

References

2004 albums
Lisa Loeb albums
Zoë Records albums
Albums produced by Chad Fischer
Albums produced by John Shanks